Undressed is the debut album by American queercore band Pansy Division, released in March 1993 on Lookout! Records.

Singer-songwriter Jon Ginoli had previously released Undressed independently on cassette tape in 1991, featuring a different line-up with bassist Chris Bowe which was recorded in Champaign, Illinois. Nine of the tracks from these sessions were included on the Lookout! release of the album.

Undressed received positive reviews from the independent music press. In a brief capsule review, AllMusic rated the album with 4.5 out of 5 stars, writing "These sex punks tunefully and loudly wag their penises and preferences about" and delivering the most praise on the "Byrds-influenced" "Boyfriend Wanted".

Track listing
All songs written by Jon Ginoli, except where noted.
"Versatile" – 3:01
"Fem in a Black Leather Jacket" – 2:04
"Bunnies" – 2:03
"Boyfriend Wanted" – 2:52
"The Story So Far" – 2:47
"Hippy Dude" – 3:02
"Curvature" – 2:17
"The Cocksucker Club" – 2:20
"Crabby Day" – 2:46
"Luck of the Draw" – 2:25
"Rock & Roll Queer Bar" (Ginoli/Ramones) – 1:40
"Surrender Your Clothing" – 3:59
"Anthem" – 2:24

Personnel
Pansy Division
Jon Ginoli – vocals, guitars
Chris Freeman – bass, backing vocals
Patrick Hawley – drums

Additional musicians
Sally Schlosstein – drums on tracks 4 and 7
Chris Bowe – bass on tracks 1, 3, 5, 6, 8-11, 13
Kent Whitesall – lead guitar on tracks 1, 5, 6, 13, percussion on track 9

References

1993 debut albums
Pansy Division albums
Lookout! Records albums